Daniel Block is an American jazz clarinetist who has worked with artists such as Charles Mingus, Toshiko Akiyoshi and Gerry Mulligan. He is a member of the Marty Grosz Band, and also can be found in the pits of various Broadway shows in New York City.

Early life and education 
Block is a native of St. Louis. He earned a Bachelor of Music and Master of Music from the Juilliard School.

Career 
As a student at Juilliard, Block became involved in the New York City jazz scene. He participated in the recording process of Something Like a Bird. After graduating from Juilliard, Block joined Skah Shah, a Haitian band, and has since performed with several prominent jazz musicians.

References 

Year of birth missing (living people)
Living people
American jazz clarinetists
21st-century clarinetists

Juilliard School alumni
Juilliard School faculty
Jazz musicians from Missouri
Musicians from St. Louis